Netra is a panchayat village in Gujarat, India. Administratively it is under Nakhatrana Taluka in Kutch District, Gujarat.

There are two villages in the Netra gram panchayat: Netra and Bandiyara.

Demographics 
In the 2001 census, the village of Netra had 4,787 inhabitants, with 2,366 males (49.4%) and 2,421 females (50.6%), for a gender ratio of 1023 females per thousand males.

Notes

Villages in Kutch district